Mantissa may refer to:

 Mantissa (logarithm), the fractional part of the common (base-10) logarithm
 Mantissa (floating point number), the significant digits of a floating-point number or a number in scientific notation, also called the significand
 Mantissa (band)
 Mantissa (novel), a 1982 novel by John Fowles
 Mantissa College
 De anima libri mantissa, sometimes simply referred as Mantissa, treatise attributed to Alexander of Aphrodisias

 

Mathematics disambiguation pages